McGloin is an Irish surname originating in Munster. Notable people with the surname include:

Matt McGloin (born 1989), American football player
Mike McGloin (c. 1862–1883), American criminal

References